Scheu is a German surname.  Notable people with the name include:

 Andreas Scheu (1844–1927), Austrian politician
 Elizabeth Scheu or Elizabeth Close (1912–2011), American architect
 Franz Scheu, Austrian footballer
 Georg Scheu (1879–1949), German botanist, plant physiologist, oenologist and grape breeder
 Robin Scheu (born 1995), German footballer
 Robin Scheu (politician), American politician
 Solomon Scheu (1822–1888), German-American businessman and politician

See also
Shue, surname
Scheuer, surname

German-language surnames